The Santa Clara County Board of Supervisors is the board of supervisors governing Santa Clara County, California. It is made of elected representatives from each of the county's five districts. As a result of the 2022 elections, members of the Democratic Party currently hold all seats on the board. 

Districts and current members

District 1 includes Los Gatos, Monte Sereno, Morgan Hill, Gilroy, part of South San Jose, and some unincorporated area. It is currently represented by Supervisor Sylvia Arenas.

District 2 includes part of San Jose and some unincorporated area. It is currently represented by Democratic Supervisor Cindy Chavez.

District 3 includes Milpitas, parts of San Jose and Sunnyvale, and some unincorporated area. It is currently represented by Democratic Supervisor Otto Lee.

District 4 includes Campbell, Santa Clara, part of San Jose, and some unincorporated area. It is currently represented by Democratic Supervisor Susan Ellenberg.

District 5  includes Cupertino, Los Altos, Los Altos Hills, Mountain View, Palo Alto, Saratoga, part of Sunnyvale, and some unincorporated area. It is currently represented by Democratic Supervisor Joe Simitian.

References 

County governing bodies in the United States
Government of Santa Clara County, California